WMOS (102.3 FM, "102.3 The Wolf") is a classic rock radio station that targets the Connecticut and Rhode Island coastlines from New London, Connecticut, to South Kingstown, Rhode Island (according to Radio-Locator) and it is licensed to Stonington, Connecticut. It broadcasts at 102.3 MHz with 3 kilowatts ERP from a tower located in Westerly, Rhode Island. The station is owned and operated by Cumulus Media and is "powered by Mohegan Sun," the casino in Uncasville.  The Mohegan Sun casino also hosts the station's studios.

On March 17, 2008, WMOS changed its frequency from 104.7 FM to 102.3 FM, swapping frequencies with sister station WXLM.

History
102.3 was assigned the call letters WFAN on November 3, 1981 playing a full service mix of news, sports and adult contemporary music. Later, the music shifted to a Contemporary Hit format with the slogan "Better Hit Music Fun 102". The format changed to satellite delivered AC and the call letters were changed to WORQ on June 20, 1984. The slogan was "102 WORQ, Working for you". The call letters changed again August 17, 1987 to WVVE, starting as a gold based AC and then moving to a full  Oldies format known as 102.3 The Wave The station kept the call letters WVVE until December 29, 1999, when Citadel Broadcasting purchased the station and flipped formats to Hard rock as ROCK 102. . They soon changed calls to WAXK. 
ROCK 102 flipped to a Classic Hits format under the moniker XL 102 and the WUXL call letters in February 2002. . XL 102 featured the syndicated Bob & Tom Morning show.

In February 2003 XL 102 was one of two stations that gave away tickets to a Great White Concert in West Warwick, Rhode Island, which ultimately became the scene of one of the deadliest fires in Rhode Island's history.  (The other station being Clear Channel's WHJY in Providence, Rhode Island). In March 2003, a few weeks after the fire XL 102 flipped formats to Adult Contemporary music and changed its calls to WXLM. (The format change was rumored to be just a coincidence.) As AC formatted MIX 102, WXLM competed against long-time ratings leader Soft Rock 106.5, WBMW. .

WXLM dumped its Adult Contemporary format and began simulcasting the news/talk format of sister station WSUB AM 980 in April 2005. WSUB began promoting the simulcast in mid-March. . WXLM officially became News-Talk 102.3 FM in late June 2005, after WSUB went Spanish as Magia 980. 

On March 17, 2008, WXLM's news/talk format moved to 104.7 FM; concurrently, the classic rock programming of WMOS moved to 102.3. Both formats remained the same.  In 2010, the news/talk format migrated back as WXLM to AM 980; 104.7 now operates as WELJ.

Citadel merged with Cumulus Media on September 16, 2011.

References

External links
102.3 The Wolf Website
AAC Streaming Link
MP3 Streaming Link

Coverage map for WMOS

Cumulus Media radio stations
Classic rock radio stations in the United States
MOS
Radio stations established in 1981
1981 establishments in Connecticut